Several vessels have been named Duck for the duck:

 was launched in Boston in 1804, presumably under another name. She was taken in prize in 1812 and became a British merchantman. She spent much of her career sailing between Britain and Newfoundland. In 1813 French frigates captured her, but released her. She was wrecked on 15 October 1829.
 was launched at Stettin, probably under another name. She became a British merchant vessel circa 1813. The  captured Duck off the coast of Africa, took off her crew, and sank her.

Ship names